Nancy Garlock Edmunds (born 1947) is a senior United States district judge of the United States District Court for the Eastern District of Michigan.

Education and career

Born in Detroit, Michigan, Edmunds received a Bachelor of Arts degree from Cornell University in 1969, a Master of Arts in Teaching from the University of Chicago in 1971, and a Juris Doctor from Wayne State University Law School in 1976. She was a law clerk to Judge Ralph M. Freeman of the United States District Court for the Eastern District of Michigan from 1976 to 1978. She was in private practice in Detroit from 1978 to 1992.

Federal judge

On September 11, 1991, Edmunds was nominated by President George H. W. Bush to a seat on the United States District Court for the Eastern District of Michigan vacated by Judge Richard Fred Suhrheinrich. She was confirmed by the United States Senate on February 6, 1992, and received her commission on February 10, 1992. She assumed senior status on August 1, 2012.

References

Sources
 

1947 births
Living people
Judges of the United States District Court for the Eastern District of Michigan
United States district court judges appointed by George H. W. Bush
20th-century American judges
Cornell University alumni
University of Chicago alumni
Wayne State University Law School alumni
21st-century American judges
20th-century American women judges
21st-century American women judges